The Schock 25 is an American trailerable sailboat that was designed by W. D. Schock Corp's in-house designer, Seymour Paul as a day sailer and first built in 1961.

Production
The design was built by W. D. Schock Corp in the United States, starting in 1961, with production ending in 1964. A total of 90 boats were built.

Design
The Schock 25 is a recreational keelboat, built predominantly of fiberglass, with wood trim. It has a fractional sloop; a raked stem; a raised counter, angled transom, a keel-hung rudder controlled by a tiller and a fixed fin keel. It displaces  and carries  of ballast. It has a small cuddy cabin with a single port per side and two berths and a large stern lazarette.

See also
List of sailing boat types

References

External links
Photo of a Schock 25 sailing
Photo of a Schock 25 showing hull, keel and rudder
Photo of a Schock 25 showing hull, keel and rudder

Keelboats
1960s sailboat type designs
Sailing yachts
Trailer sailers
Sailboat type designs by Seymour Paul
Sailboat types built by W. D. Schock Corp